Adonis Bosso (born 10 July 1990) is an Ivorian-Canadian model.

Early life
Bosso was born in the Ivory Coast and raised in Montreal, Quebec. He is the oldest of 6 siblings.

Career
Bosso was discovered in 2009, when he accompanied a girlfriend to a modeling agency; he was signed on the spot. Bosso had intended to become a childcare worker for children with special needs.

Bosso has modeled for brands including Dolce & Gabbana, H&M, Armani Exchange, Belstaff, Gap Inc., Levi's, TOM FORD, Yeezy, Vivienne Westwood, Banana Republic, and Thom Browne. Bosso was brought to mainstream recognition by fashion executive Nick Wooster.

Bosso currently ranks as a "Money Guy" on models.com. He formerly ranked on their "Top 50 Men" list.

Personal life
Bosso has a son with American model and actress Slick Woods. Bosso identifies as sexually fluid.

References 

1990 births
Canadian male models
Ivorian emigrants to Canada
LGBT models
LGBT men
Living people
Models from Montreal
21st-century LGBT people